Rosa Castillo may refer to:
 Rosa Castillo Varó (born 1974), Spanish footballer
 Rosa Castillo (basketball) (born 1956), Spanish basketball player
 Rosa Castillo (artist) (1910–1989), Mexican sculptor